The Dendermonde nursery attack was a stabbing attack on the Fabeltjesland daycare centre in the Flemish village of Sint-Gillis-bij-Dendermonde in Dendermonde, Belgium, at 10:00 a.m. CET (9:00 a.m. UTC) on January 23, 2009. Three people were stabbed to death, and twelve were mutilated in the attack. The suspect has been linked to a separate murder of an elderly lady and police have suggested he was plotting more nursery attacks. The daycare centre where the initial attack occurred is expected never to reopen.

Attack
Kim de Gelder, a 20-year-old Belgian from Sinaai, entered the Fabeltjesland nursery through an unlocked side-door, claiming that he had a question to ask. He then entered one of the rooms and began attacking small children before moving to another room. He was reported to be wearing black-and-white makeup with his hair vividly colored red, similar to that of the Joker from the Batman films (who, however, has green hair and white and red facial features). De Gelder's attorney, Jaak Haentjens, later formally denied any link to "the Joker", attributing the claims of face paint to De Gelder's pale skin. De Gelder was, in the eyes of his friends and colleagues, a silent boy, who never said anything.

A total of eighteen infants under the age of three and six adults were in the nursery at the time of the attack. Two infants and one adult were killed; six children, all between one and three years old, were seriously injured; another four suffered minor injuries; and nine escaped unscathed. The alleged perpetrator left the scene on his bike.

Victims 
 Leon Garcia-Mannaert, an eight-month-old boy,
 Corneel Vermeir, a nine-month-old boy,
 Marita Blindeman, a 54-year-old.

Initial reports on Belgian television suggested that five people had been killed and twenty others had been injured, with government officials only confirming the death of one adult and one child. This number was later increased, as another infant had died from the injuries he had sustained. It has also been reported that some of the surviving children have needed plastic surgery due to serious mutilations.

Investigation
A massive search operation was mounted, and a man was captured by police a short while later, in the nearby town of Lebbeke. Having been wounded during his capture, the man was taken to a hospital in Aalst, Belgium. Police reported that he was carrying a list of nurseries, which they suspect he may have been planning to attack as well.

At a press conference on the evening of the attack, public prosecutor Christian Du Four provided the following information about the alleged offender, denying several early rumours:

Perpetrator
De Gelder was identified as the attacker on 25 January 2009. De Gelder confided in his attorney, stating that he had been troubled by depression as a teenager and at one point heard voices in his head. Regardless, a psychiatrist had concluded that he did not need to be sent to a mental institution.

On 26 January 2009, Belgian officials named De Gelder as the primary suspect in a further, fourth murder, where a 73-year-old woman was stabbed to death in her apartment in Beveren, near Antwerp, on January 16. Prosecutor Christian Du Four told journalists that there were "very clear indications of links between the murders", though De Gelder denies any involvement. Police have stated that he was planning attacks on other nurseries.

On 27 January, De Gelder admitted to the attacks. The media originally reported that De Gelder was wearing makeup at the time of the attack, making him look like the Joker, but police have not confirmed that depiction. In further media reports, De Gelder reportedly watched The Dark Knight an unusually high number of times ("film obsession"), appears to have quoted the character Harvey Dent at the start of the attack. Both police investigators and De Gelder's lawyer have made statements dismissing such as relevant to his motive in the attack.

De Gelder's attorneys argued that he had schizophrenia and therefore could not be held fully accountable for his actions. Psychiatrists believed that De Gelder was faking psychosis and instead diagnosed him with schizotypal personality disorder with psychopathic traits and narcissistic features. The College of Psychiatrists concluded De Gelder was mentally ill but competent to stand trial, and was in control of his actions when he committed the murders.

On 22 March 2013, a jury declared De Gelder was fully accountable for the attack and found him guilty of four counts of murder. He was sentenced to life imprisonment the following day.

Memorials 
The mayor of Dendermonde, Piet Buyse, said, "The victims are being cared for and those who were not injured have been brought to a centre where they are receiving counseling."

Italian singer Luciano Ligabue dedicated a song to the victims,  featured on his 2010 album, .

Some 6,000 people marched through Dendermonde on 25 January 2009, laying hundreds of bouquets and stuffed animals outside the daycare centre as the Mayor of Dendermonde, Piet Buyse, announced that the Fabeltjesland nursery would never reopen.

See also
 List of massacres in Belgium

References

2009 murders in Belgium
Deaths by stabbing in Belgium
Dendermonde
January 2009 events in Europe
Mass stabbings in Europe
Massacres in Belgium
Murder in Belgium
Stabbing attacks in Belgium
Mass murder in 2009